Requena  is an airstrip serving the Tapiche River town of Requena in the Loreto Region of Peru. The runway also serves as a street, and is lined with houses on its west side.

See also

Transport in Peru
List of airports in Peru

References

External links
OpenStreetMap - Requena
OurAirports - Requena
SkyVector - Requena

Airports in Peru
Buildings and structures in Loreto Region